Sketchi is an album by Cex released in 2007. The album's cover is a modified version of the movie poster for the 1988 Arnold Schwarzenegger and Danny DeVito comedy Twins.

Track listing
 "Damon Kvols" - 10:25	Cex
 "Rattler Bin" - 5:41	Cex
 "Waiting 4 Yankovic" - 6:08
 "Camber Sands" - 6:10
 "Gooby Says" - 6:42
 "Oregon Ridge" - 7:03
 "Suffocating Champion" - 6:40
 "God Blessing" - 6:00
 "Pilsenmx" - 6:04 (feat. Nice Nice)

References

2007 albums
Cex (musician) albums